Belbas is a Village Development Committee  in Pyuthan, a Middle Hills district of Rapti Zone, western Nepal.

Etymology

Bel - an edible fruit-producing tree species, sacred to Lord Shiva and central to a coming of age ceremony for Newar girls.Bas  - resting place or camp.Thus a resting place with Bel trees.

Villages in VDC

References

External links
UN map of VDC boundaries, water features and roads in Pyuthan District

Populated places in Pyuthan District